Rodney C. McKeever is an American former college basketball player at The Citadel.  He was named Southern Conference Player of the Year in 1976, the first of two Bulldogs to claim the award since its establishment in 1952.  McKeever is a Charleston, South Carolina native and graduate of Garrett High School, where he was known as an excellent shooter and ball handler.

College career
McKeever led the Bulldogs in scoring all three years of his career, joining the starting lineup in just the second game of his first season.  He amassed 1,358 points in his career, good for third place at the time he departed the program, and seventh as of 2012.

McKeever resigned from The Citadel late in his junior year.  Citadel President Lt. Gen. George M. Seignious stressed that his departure had nothing to do with basketball, the coach, or the team. McKeever had told a professor he had to miss class because he was going to the hospital, which was a lie, and due to the strict standards of the honor code at a military school he was forced to resign.

Statistics

Scoring

Career Statistics

Player recognition
The records section is accurate through the 2011–12 season.

Honors
Southern Conference Men's Basketball Player of the Year (1976)

Records
Category (total), place on Citadel list
Points, Career (1,358), 7th
Scoring Average, Career (19.4), 2nd
30–Point Games (6), 3rd
Points, Season (553 in 1975–76), 4th
Scoring Average, Season (23.0 in 1974–75), 3rd
Scoring Average, Season (20.5 in 1975–76), 8th
Field Goals, Season (225), T–2nd
Points, Game (39) 4th (vs UNC Wilmington, Dec. 3, 1974)
Points, Game (38) T–5th (vs Furman, Dec. 30, 1975)

References

1955 births
Living people
The Citadel Bulldogs basketball players
African-American basketball players
Basketball players from South Carolina
Sportspeople from Charleston, South Carolina
Point guards
American men's basketball players
21st-century African-American people
20th-century African-American sportspeople